Levens may refer to:

People
 Amanda Levens, an American women's college basketball coach
 Dorsey Levens, an American football running back
 Justin Levens, an American mixed martial artist
 Marie Levens, a politician
 Peter Levens, an English lexicographer
 Philip Levens, an American screenwriter and television producer

Places
 , France
 Levens, Alpes-Maritimes, France
 Levens, Cumbria, England

See also 
 Leven (disambiguation)